William Byrne (22 October 1918 – 2001) was an English footballer.

Career
Byrne joined Port Vale as an amateur in March 1946 and after making his debut in a war cup match in April that year, signed as a professional the next month. He played fifteen league and one FA Cup game in the 1946–47 season, but only scored two goals in wins over Mansfield Town and Notts County in the Third Division South. He left The Old Recreation Ground in July 1947, when manager Gordon Hodgson transferred him to nearby Crewe Alexandra of the Third Division North. He scored one goal in 18 appearances for the "Railwaymen" in 1947–48 and 1948–49 under Frank Hill and then Arthur Turner. He later he played for non-league Stafford Rangers.

Career statistics
Source:

References

1918 births
2001 deaths
Sportspeople from Newcastle-under-Lyme
English footballers
Association football forwards
Port Vale F.C. players
Crewe Alexandra F.C. players
Stafford Rangers F.C. players
English Football League players